The Bibliotheca Thysiana was erected in 1655 to house the book collection of the lawyer Johannes Thysius (1621–1653). Upon his early death, he left a legacy of 20,000 guilders for the building of a public library ("tot publycque dienst der studie") with a custodian's dwelling. Designed by the architect Arent van ‘s-Gravensande, the building follows the Dutch Classical style and is regarded as one of the jewels of Dutch 17th-century architecture. Bibliotheca Thysiana is one of the Top 100 Dutch heritage sites. It is distinguished by its balanced proportions and the purity of its Ionic order on top of a high basement.

The Bibliotheca Thysiana is the only surviving 17th century example in the Netherlands of a building that was designed as a public library.  It is quite extraordinary that a complete private 17th century library has been preserved and thus offers a good impression of the book collection of a young, learned bibliophile from the period of late Humanism.  The collection contains about 2,500 books and thousands of pamphlets in all scientific fields. The library also houses one of the 14 still existing bookwheels in the world.

The library has a separate special collection of several hundred books from and about Emanuel Swedenborg.

Publications (selection) 
  Adriaan Smout: The Thysius Lute Book / Het Luitboek van Thysius. Facs. ed. (ms. 1666). Leiden & Utrecht, 2009. 
  Paul Hoftijzer: Bibliotheca Thysiana. 'Tot publijcke dienst der studie' . Leiden, 2008
  Esther Mourits: Fortune - Du Bartas dans la Bibliotheca Thysiana à Leyde. In: Oeuvres & critiques; vol. 29 (2004), no. 2, pag. 78-86 
  D'avoir une chambre garnie de plus belles editions. Uit de correspondenties van Johannes Thysius. [Ed.: Esther Mourits & G.H.M. Posthumus Meyjes]. Leiden, Bibliotheca Thysiana, 2001.

External links 

  Website Bibliotheca Thysiana
  Inventory of the archives of Bibliotheca Thysiana (University Library Leiden)
  Article about Bibliotheca Thysiana (in Dutch)
 Collection of the Bibliotheca Thysiana (catalogue University Library Leiden)

Academic libraries in the Netherlands
Research libraries in the Netherlands
Leiden University
Buildings and structures completed in 1655
Library buildings completed in the 17th century
Buildings and structures in Leiden
1655 establishments in the Dutch Republic